Uzbekistan first participated at the Olympic Games as an independent nation in 1994, and has sent athletes to compete in every Games since then. Previously, Uzbek athletes competed as part of the Soviet Union at the Olympics from 1952 to 1988, and after the dissolution of the Soviet Union, Uzbekistan was part of the Unified Team in 1992. 

Uzbek athletes have won a total of twenty six medals at the Summer Olympic Games, mostly in wrestling and boxing.  The nation has also won a single medal at the Winter Olympic Games. The National Olympic Committee for Uzbekistan was created in 1992 and recognized by the International Olympic Committee in 1993.

Medals

Medals by Summer Games

Medals by Winter Games

Medals by Summer Sport

Medals by Winter Sport

Medalists

Summer Olympics

Winter Olympics

Change Medalists

 Ivan Efremov from 4th place to bronze (Weightlifting at the 2012 Summer Olympics – Men's 105 kg)

Disqualified Medalists

See also
 Uzbekistan at the Paralympics
 List of flag bearers for Uzbekistan at the Olympics
 :Category:Olympic competitors for Uzbekistan

External links
 
 
 

 
Olympics